The superficial inguinal ring is bounded below by the crest of the pubis; on either side by the margins of the opening in the aponeurosis, which are called the crura of the ring; and above, by a series of curved intercrural fibers. 
 The inferior crus (or lateral, or external pillar) is the stronger and is formed by that portion of the inguinal ligament which is inserted into the pubic tubercle; it is curved so as to form a kind of groove, upon which, in the male, the spermatic cord rests. 
 The superior crus (or medial, or internal pillar) is a broad, thin, flat band, attached to the front of the pubic symphysis and interlacing with its fellow of the opposite side.

See also
 Wiktionary: crus

References

External links
 
 medial
  - "Anterior Abdominal Wall: Borders of the Superficial Inguinal Ring"
 
 
 lateral
  - "Anterior Abdominal Wall: Borders of the Superficial Inguinal Ring"

Abdomen